This article is about French literature from the  year 2000 to the present day.

Overview 
The economic, political and social crises of contemporary France -terrorism, violence, immigration, unemployment, racism, etc.—and (for some) the notion that France has lost its sense of identity and international prestige—through the rise of American hegemony, the growth of Europe and of global capitalism—have created what some critics (like Nancy Huston) have seen as a new form of detached nihilism, reminiscent of the 50s and 60s (Beckett, Cioran). The best known of these authors is Michel Houellebecq, whose Atomised was a major international phenomenon.  These tendencies have also come under attack. In one of her essays, Nancy Huston criticises Houellebecq for his nihilism; she also makes an acerbic censure of his novels in her work The teachers of despair.

Although the contemporary social and political context can be felt in recent works, overall, French literature written in past decades has been disengaged from explicit political discussion (unlike the authors of the 1930s–1940s or the generation of 1968) and has focused on the intimate and the anecdotal. It has tended to no longer see itself as a means of criticism or world transformation, with some notable exceptions (such as Michel Houellebecq or Maurice Dantec).

Other contemporary writers during the last decade have consciously used the process of "autofiction" (similar to the notion of "faction") to renew the novel (Christine Angot for example). "Autofiction" is a term invented by Serge Doubrovsky in 1977. It is a new sort of romanticised autobiography that resembles the writing of the romantics of the nineteenth century. A few other authors may be perceived as vaguely belonging to this group: Emmanuel Carrère, Alice Ferney, Annie Ernaux, Olivia Rosenthal, Anne Wiazemsky, and Vassilis Alexakis.  In a related vein, Catherine Millet's 2002 memoir The Sexual Life of Catherine M. gained much press for its frank exploration of the author's sexual experiences.

Contemporary French authors include:  Jonathan Littell,  David Foenkinos, Jean-Michel Espitallier, Christophe Tarkos, Olivier Cadiot, Chloé Delaume,  Patrick Bouvet, Charles Pennequin,  Nathalie Quintane, Frédéric-Yves Jeannet, Nina Bouraoui, Hubries le Dieu, Arno Bertina, Edouard Levé, Bruno Guiblet, Christophe Fiat, and Tristan Garcia.

Many of the most lauded works in French over the last decades have been written by individuals from former French colonies or overseas possessions. This Francophone literature includes the novels of Ahmadou Kourouma (Côte d'Ivoire), Tahar ben Jelloun (Morocco), Patrick Chamoiseau (Martinique), Amin Maalouf (Lebanon), Mehdi Belhaj Kacem (Tunisia), Assia Djebar (Algeria) and Mohamed Mbougar Sarr (Senegal).

France has a number of important literary awards Grand Prix du roman de l'Académie française, Prix Décembre, Prix Femina, Prix Flore, Prix Goncourt, Prix Interallié, Prix Médicis, and Prix Renaudot. In 2011 a new, controversial, award was created called Prix des prix littéraires ("Prize of Literary Prizes") which picks its winner from among the winners of these prizes.

Extrême contemporain
The term extrême contemporain is a French expression used to indicate French literary production published in France in the last 10 years. The extrême contemporain is, then, an ever-shifting concept.

This term was used for the first time by French writer Michel Chaillou in 1987. This simple and convenient definition hides a complex and chaotic literary situation, both from the chronological point of view (the temporal boundaries of the extrême contemporain are in continuous shifting) and for the hetereogeneity of present French literary production, which cannot be defined in a clear and homogeneous way.  The term extrême contemporain, therefore, is all-inclusive. The literary production of this period is characterized by a transitory quality; because of the manifolded nature of such an immense corpus of texts, the identification of specific tendencies is inevitably partial and precarious.

Therefore, to define the extrême contemporain as a literary movement would be very improper: it is a mere term of convenience used by commentators and not by the authors themselves.

The extrême contemporain can be seen as a "literary constellation" hardly organized in schemes. In some cases, authors of the extrême contemporain follow an "aesthetics of fragments":  their narration is broken into pieces or they show, like Pascal Quignard, for instance, a preference for short sentences. The "apportionment" of knowledge can also be carried out by the use of a chaotic verbal stream, the interior monologue, tropisms, repetition and endophasy. The feeling of uncertainty experience by writers leads him to put in question the notion of novel and its very form, preferring the more general notion of récit. Then, a return to reality takes place: in Pierre Bergounioux's works, readers witness the cultural upsetting concerning generations which follow one another; François Bon describes the exclusion from social and industrial reality; many authors of crime stories, like Jean-Patrick Manchette and Didier Daeninckx, describe social and political reality, and so it does Maurice G. Dantec in his works halfway between spy stories and science fiction; on another side, Annie Ernaux's écriture plate ("flat writing") tries to demolish the distance between reality and its narration.

Subjects are shown in a persistent state of crisis. However, a return to everyday life and trivial habits also takes place: the attention is focused to the "outcasts of literature", like, for instance, old people. This use of triviality and everyday life expresses itself in a new sort of "minimalism": from Pierre Michon's Small lives fictional biographies of unknown people, to Philippe Delerm's "small pleasures". The facets of this minimalism manifest themselves in many ways, through the triviality of the subject, through short forms, or through concise and bare phrases. On one hand, heroicized characters try to build up their own individual way against a senseless reality, so that emarginated or marginal people emerge through the building up of their own story; on the other hand, a "negative minimalism" takes place: characters stagnate in social and relational difficulties.

French authors of the extrême contemporain (selection)

 Eliette Abécassis
 Jean-Pierre Abraham
 Olivier Adam
 Emmanuel Adely
 Hafid Aggoune
 Eva Almassy
 Marc Alpozzo
 Jacques-Pierre Amette
 Jean-Pierre Andrevon
 Christine Angot
 Yann Apperry
 Claude Arnaud
 Pierre Assouline
 Alexis Aubenque
 Brigitte Aubert
 Antoine Audouard
 Yvan Audouard
 Pierre Autin-Grenier
 Ayerdhal
 François Bégaudeau
 Frédéric Beigbeder
 Pierre Bergounioux
 Arno Bertina
 Jacques A. Bertrand
 François Bon
 Michel Chaillou
 Christophe Claro
 Philippe Claudel
 Philippe Delerm
 Christine Deroin
 Maryline Desbiolles
 Michèle Desbordes
 Virginie Despentes
 Jean Echenoz
 Annie Ernaux
 Maxence Fermine
 Michael Ferrier
 Alain Fleischer
 Christian Gailly
 Sylvie Germain
 Michel Houellebecq
 Frédéric-Yves Jeannet
 Jean-Marie Laclavetine
 Camille Laurens
 Gabriel Méxène
 Pierre Michon
 Alain Nadaud
 Claude Ollier
 Christian Oster
 Daniel Pennac
 Pascal Quignard
 Jean Rolin
Olivier Rolin
 Tiphaine Samoyault
 Colombe Schneck
 Tanguy Viel
 Antoine Volodine
 Cécile Wajsbrot

See also
 French literature
 List of French language authors

Notes

References
 Littérature francophone, by Jean-Louis Joubert. Paris: Nathan, 1992
 Littérature moderne du monde francophone, by Peter Thompson. Chicago: National Textbook Company (McGraw-Hill), 1997
 Négritude et nouveaux monde—poésie noire: africaine, antillaise, malgache, by Peter Thompson. Concord, MA: Wayside Publishing, 1994
 Dominique Viart, Le roman français au XXe siècle, Paris, würzburg, 1999.
 Matteo Majorano (ed.), Le goût du roman, Bari, B. A. Graphis, 2002.
 Matteo Majorano (ed.), Le jeu des arts, Bari, B. A. Graphis, 2005.
 Dominique Viart, Bruno Vercier, La littérature française au présent: Héritage, modernité, mutations, Paris, Bordas, 2005
 Bibliographie. Études sur la prose française de l'extrême contemporain en Italie et en France (1984–2006), Bari, B. A. Graphis, 2007

External links 
 The GREC – Groupe de Recherche sur l'Extrême Contemporain

 8
Contemporary literature